Eucalyptus dwyeri, commonly known as Dwyer's red gum or Dwyer's mallee gum, is a species of small tree, sometimes a mallee that is endemic to eastern Australia. It has smooth, white or cream-coloured bark, lance-shaped to curved adult leaves, flower buds in groups of seven and conical, bell-shaped or hemispherical fruit.

Description
It has smooth white to cream coloured or greyish brown bark that is shed in plates or flakes. Flowering occurs from September to December and the flowers are white.

Taxonomy and naming
Eucalyptus dwyeri was first described in 1925 by Joseph Maiden and William Blakely from a specimen collected at Gungal near Merriwa by John Boorman and the description was published in Journal and Proceedings of the Royal Society of New South Wales. The specific epithet (dwyeri) honours "James Wilfred Dwyer, Roman Catholic Bishop of Wagga, N.S.W., who, when Parish Priest of Temora, collected this species on several occasions, and who has been an acute observer of native plants for many years," although the priest's name was Joseph Wilfrid Dwyer.

Distribution and habitat
Dwyer's red gum grows in mallee shrubland in shallow soils on ridges west of the Great Dividing Range in New South Wales and southern Queensland. It has also been recorded from northern Victoria but the Royal Botanic Gardens Victoria suggests that these records are better referred to E. blakelyi.

References

dwyeri
Myrtales of Australia
Flora of New South Wales
Flora of Queensland
Trees of Australia
Plants described in 1925
Taxa named by Joseph Maiden
Taxa named by William Blakely